Cesca is an Italian surname. Notable people with the surname include:

Alessandro Cesca (born 1980), Italian footballer
Bob Cesca (born 1971), American director, producer, writer, actor, blogger, and political commentator

See also
Cescau (disambiguation)
Cesca chair

Italian-language surnames